The Nervous Wreck is a 1926 American silent comedy adventure film directed by Scott Sidney and starring Harrison Ford, Phyllis Haver and Chester Conklin. It is based on the play The Nervous Wreck by Owen Davis, inspired by an earlier story The Wreck by E.J. Rath. The play later became a musical on which the 1930 film Whoopee! was based and also inspired the 1944 film Up in Arms.

Synopsis
Wrongly believing himself to be suffering from a fatal illness, a Pittsburgh man sets out for Arizona but stops at a ranch for a meal on the way. There he is tricked into eloping with the daughter of the house, engaged to a local sheriff. The couple are subsequently pursued by the sheriff and the girl's father, and during a series of adventures he discovers that his poor health was all in his mind.

Cast
 Harrison Ford as Henry Williams
 Phyllis Haver as Sally Morgan
 Chester Conklin as 	Mort
 Mack Swain as Jerome Underwood
 Hobart Bosworth as Jud Morgan
 Paul Nicholson as Bob Wells
 Vera Steadman as 	Harriet Underwood
 Charles K. Gerrard as Reggie De Vere
 Clarence Burton as 	Andy McNab

References

Bibliography
 Connelly, Robert B. The Silents: Silent Feature Films, 1910-36, Volume 40, Issue 2. December Press, 1998.
 Munden, Kenneth White. The American Film Institute Catalog of Motion Pictures Produced in the United States, Part 1. University of California Press, 1997.

External links

 

1926 films
1926 comedy films
1920s English-language films
American silent feature films
Silent American comedy films
Films directed by Scott Sidney
American black-and-white films
Producers Distributing Corporation films
American films based on plays
1920s American films